The Stubaier Wildspitze is a 3,341-metre-high mountain in the Stubai Alps in the Austrian state of Tyrol. Northeast of the summit lie two glaciers, the Schaufelferner and the Daunkogelferner, which form the basis for the Stubai Glacier ski region.

The first documented ascent by tourists was in 1882 by E. v. Fuchs, M. Egger and Josef Pfurtscheller.

Alpine three-thousanders
Mountains of Tyrol (state)
Mountains of the Alps
Stubai Alps